The Maple Street Overpass is a historic bridge in Fayetteville, Arkansas. The bridge carries West Maple Street over the railroad tracks running just east of the University of Arkansas at Fayetteville campus. The bridge has a decorative Art Deco balustrade with inset lights on both sides. The bridge was designed by regional bridge designer Frederick Lutt Johann, and built in 1936.

The bridge was listed on the National Register of Historic Places in 1995.

See also
List of bridges documented by the Historic American Engineering Record in Arkansas
List of bridges on the National Register of Historic Places in Arkansas
National Register of Historic Places listings in Washington County, Arkansas

References

External links

Road bridges on the National Register of Historic Places in Arkansas
Bridges completed in 1936
Historic American Engineering Record in Arkansas
National Register of Historic Places in Fayetteville, Arkansas
Concrete bridges in the United States
Transportation in Washington County, Arkansas
1936 establishments in Arkansas
Art Deco architecture in Arkansas